Salak Selatan LRT station is a Malaysian low-rise rapid transit station situated near and named after the Kuala Lumpur township of Salak South. The station is part of the Sri Petaling Line (formerly known as STAR).

The station was opened on July 11, 1998, as part of the second phase of the STAR system's opening, including 7 new stations along the Chan Sow Lin-Sri Petaling route.

Location
The Salak Selatan station is intended to serve the incorporated town of Salak South directly to the east; the station itself located behind a row of shophouses along Salak South's main carriageway, Jalan Sungai Besi, towards the east. The stations exits to both Salak South to the west and Bandar Sri Permaisuri to the east.

The Salak Selatan station was constructed along two leveled tracks, reusing the now defunct Federated Malay States Railway and Malayan Railway route between Kuala Lumpur, Ampang and Salak South.

The station is currently one of two railway stations serving the Salak South locality, the other being a KTM Komuter station bearing the same name. While the STAR station is considerably closer to Salak Selatan, the Komuter station is located some 400 metres south from the town. Unlike other examples in Kuala Lumpur, the two stations are not noted on transit maps as interchange stations between the two lines. The same case is with Sentul's LRT and Komuter stations which serve the same area but are two separate stations and are far from each other.

Design

Overall, the Salak Selatan station was built as a low-rise station along two tracks for trains traveling in opposite directions. Because the station is nearly subsurface and features two side platforms, the station designates individual ticketing areas for each of the station's two platforms at their level, ensuring access to trains traveling the opposite direction is not freely possible. The station also serves as a public crossing across the railway tracks between Salak South and Bandar Sri Permaisuri via a walkway running underneath the STAR line and platforms.

The principal styling of the station is similar to most other stations in the line, featuring multi-tiered roofs supported by latticed frames, and white plastered walls and pillars. Because stairways are only used to link street level with the station's ticket areas and platforms, the station is not accessible to disabled users.

See also

 List of rail transit stations in Klang Valley

Ampang Line
Railway stations opened in 1998